The Forum Domshof is a sheltered area with a glass roof on the Domshof square in the centre of Bremen in northern Germany. It contains the Bistro-Café Alex, which was built in 1998.

History
In 1998/99, after the tram stop had been relocated, the Domshof-Forum was built to the design of the architect's office Joachim Schürmann. The three-storeyed building below this roof which occupies approximately one third of the Domshof looks like giant glass containers piled up on top of each other. The floor space of  allows for 150 seats. The Domshof Café consists of glass, steel, white square wall panels and white sun-protection blinds. The outdoor area below the roof offers a wide view across the Domshof. The building is operated by the Bistro-Café Alex.

References

 	

Buildings and structures in Bremen (city)
Buildings and structures completed in 1999
1999 establishments in Germany